These are the official results of the Men's Pole Vault event at the 1995 IAAF World Championships in Gothenburg, Sweden. There were a total number of 38 participating athletes, with two qualifying groups and the final held on Friday August 11, 1995. The qualification mark was set at 5.70 metres.

Medalists

Schedule
All times are Central European Time (UTC+1)

Abbreviations
All results shown are in metres

Qualifying round
Held on Tuesday 1995-08-09

Final

References
 Results
IAAF
Detailed results (p148)

P
Pole vault at the World Athletics Championships